The 2008 Currie Cup Premier Division season (known as the ABSA Currie Cup due to sponsorship) was contested from 20 June through to 25 October. The Currie Cup is an annual domestic competition for provincial rugby union teams in South Africa.

The 2007 Champions, the Free State Cheetahs, were denied a place in the final when they were defeated by the Blue Bulls in their semifinal clash in Pretoria on 11 October.

The  ended a 12-year wait for a trophy by winning 14–9 in the final against the Blue Bulls in Durban on 25 October.

Current standings

Updated 6 October 2008:

Format
Four points for a win
Two points for a draw
One bonus point for a loss by seven points or less
One bonus point for scoring four or more tries in a match

Table notes
P = Played
W = Won
D = Drawn
L = Lost
PF = Points for
PA = Points against
PD = Points difference (PF−PA)
TF = Tries for
TA = Tries against
BP = Bonus points
Pts = Total points

Teams
 Boland Cavaliers
 
 Blue Bulls
 Free State Cheetahs
 Western Province
 Griquas
 Falcons
 Lions

Currie Cup compulsory friendlies

Round 1

Round 1 summary
 The Free State Cheetahs started the defence of their title with a narrow 20–16 win over neighbours Griquas in Kimberley.
 Boland Cavaliers captain Conrad Burke scored a last minute intercept try to secure a 48–42 victory over the Falcons in their opening match at Bosman Stadium in Brakpan.
 John Mametsa celebrated him 100th game for the Blue Bulls by scoring a hat-trick to set up a 21–7 win for his team against the Lions in their opening encounter at Coca-Cola Park in Johannesburg.

Round 2

Round 2 summary
  scored their second win in as many matches, beating the Boland Cavaliers 38–13 in their match in Durban and go to the top of the standings.
 The Falcons secured their first Currie Cup victory in over a year by beating the Griquas 36–30 in Brakpan.
 With a much-improved performance from the Lions in their clash against the Free State Cheetahs. It was the home side that held their head to seal a close victory.
 Western Province produced a stirring fightback at the death of their clash against the Blue Bulls to record a 26–17 win over their traditional rivals at Newlands Stadium.

Round 3

Round 3 summary
A handful of spectators witnessed a 9–9 draw between Griquas and Boland Cavaliers at a damp and overcast Boland Stadium in Wellington.
 Lions fullback Earl Rose scored 30 points to help his team to a 35–23 win over a determined Falcons outfit in their clash at Coca-Cola Park.
 Western Province beat the Free State Cheetahs 9–3 in a dull match on a dull day at Newlands Stadium.

Round 4

Round 4 summary
 went to the top of the standings with a 28–10 win over the Falcons at ABSA Stadium in Durban, but it required a late surge against very willing opposition for the home side to earn the bonus point.
 Lions achieved their objective against the Boland Cavaliers and collected a full house of five log points from their match at Coca-Cola Park.
The Griquas secured their first victory in this season's Currie Cup with an upset victory over Western Province in Kimberley.
The Blue Bulls secured their third win of the season, beating the Free State Cheetahs 31–23 at Loftus Versfeld, but failed to secure a vital bonus point.

Round 5

Round 5 summary
 The Falcons, reduced to 14 men for the last 30 minutes of the match, handed Western Province their second defeat when they edged the Cape Town side 38–32 in an enthralling encounter in Brakpan.
 It wasn't the prettiest game of rugby, but the Blue Bulls moved to the top of the standings with a 26–10 win over the Boland Cavaliers in Wellington.
 The Lions continued their resurgent form when they hung on for a 36–32 win over a determined Griquas team in an 11-try thriller in Kimberley.
 The Free State Cheetahs bounced back into play-off contention when they smashed the sloppy  team 31–9 in their match in Bloemfontein.

Round 6

! align=centre colspan=100| Bye
|- style="background:#fff;"
| Blue Bulls
| Griquas

Round 6 summary
 The defending champions, the Free State Cheetahs, proved to be too quick and powerful for the Falcons as they raced a 55–14 win in their match in Bloemfontein.
 Western Province have redeemed the wobbly away leg of their campaign, with an emphatic 50–10 drubbing over their Cape counterparts Boland Cavaliers at Newlands.
 The  squeezed home a late 16–11 victory over the Lions in Durban, sealing a hard-fought encounter that saw a plethora of missed opportunities from both sides.
 The Blue Bulls and Griquas match was postponed till 15 August 2008.

Round 7

Round 7 summary
 The Blue Bulls raced back to the top of the standings with an emphatic 50–7 win over a game, but hopelessly outclassed, Falcons team in Brakpan.
  brought Griquas down to earth, literally, with a bang, when they scored an emphatic 44–15 win in Kimberley.
 The defending champions Free State Cheetahs managed to stay in the top two in the standings, thanks to a fortuitous 15–10 victory over a spirited Boland Cavaliers outfit in Wellington.
 The Lions edged back into the top four in the standings with a deserved 27–13 win over Western Province in Johannesburg.

Round 8

Round 8 summary
 The Boland Cavaliers scored a nail-biting 31–29 win over Falcons in a match at Boland Stadium in Wellington, after trailing 19–7 at the interval.
 The defending champion Free State Cheetahs showed superior form in finishing off neighbours Griquas and cement their place in the top two in the standings with convincing 22–3 win in Bloemfontein.
  moved back to the top of the standings with an emphatic 32–10 win over a hapless Western Province outfit in their Round Eight match at Newlands.
 The Lions, after an early season wobble, have hit some impressive mid-season form and moved further up the standings with an impressive 30–27 bonus-point win over the Blue Bulls at Loftus Versfeld in Pretoria.

Round 6 bye

Round 6 bye summary
 The Blue Bulls returned to the top of the standings after they recorded an emphatic 41–12 win over the Griquas in the Round 6 catch-up match at Loftus Versfeld.

Round 9

Round 9 summary
 The Free State Cheetahs raced back to the top of the standings with a comfortable 38–28 win over the Lions in their match in Johannesburg.
 A flurry of tries, including a hat-trick from wing MJ Mentz, saw the Griquas put on their performance of the season against the Falcons, to win 59–19 in their clash in Kimberley.
  ran in six tries to secure a coveted bonus point, in the convincing 41–7 victory over the Boland Cavaliers, despite a saturated pitch at Boland Stadium.
 A late Tiger Mangweni try gave the Blue Bulls a bonus-point 37–6 victory over Western Province in Pretoria, putting the hosts back on top of the standings after the Free State Cheetahs were on top of the standings for a week.

Round 10

Round 10 summary
 The Lions produced a polished performance to obliterate the struggling Falcons, courtesy of an 83–14 thumping at Bosman Stadium in Brakpan.
 Western Province managed to keep their slim hopes of a semifinal alive after a convincing 35–17 victory over the Free State Cheetahs in Bloemfontein.
 Wing Bjorn Basson made a star turn for his province at the Griquas swept the challenge of the Boland Cavaliers aside with a 48–22 win at ABSA Park in Kimberley.
  moved into top spot on the standings after disposing of the Blue Bulls courtesy of a 34–25 win at ABSA Stadium in Durban.

Round 11

Round 11 summary
 The Blue Bulls scored 11 tries in an effortless 69–19 trampling over a vulnerable Boland Cavaliers outfit, in their fixture at Loftus Versfeld.
 It was a leisurely Saturday stroll for Western Province, running in 14 tries over a hapless Falcons outfit to a massive 92–15 win, and closing the gap further on the final four in the standings.
 The Lions scored six tries to the Griquas two in a valuable 41–20 victory in Johannesburg, seeing them pip past the Free State Cheetahs into third place in the standings.
  regained their position on the top of the table after a physical 22–10 victory over the defending champion Free State Cheetahs in Durban.

Round 12

Round 12 summary
 Western Province have managed to overtake the Free State Cheetahs into fourth spot, and a semifinal place, in the standings after securing a bonus-point 30–18 win over Griquas at Newlands.
  consolidated their position at the top of the standings with a solid, if unspectacular 44–19 win over a brave Falcons outfit at Barnard Stadium in Kempton Park.
 The Lions managed to secure a much-needed bonus-point try in the final throes of their match against Boland Cavaliers.
 The Free State Cheetahs have dropped out of the play-off positions after a nervy performance against the Blue Bulls who condemned them to a 23–5 defeat at Park in Bloemfontein.

Round 13

Round 13 summary
 The Blue Bulls have pipped  once again and are back on top of the standings, thanks to a 58–22 haul over the Griquas in Kimberley.
 The Free State Cheetahs are back in the semifinal hunt, having leapfrogged the Western Province into fourth place after a bludgeoning 78–7 victory over the Falcons in Barkpan.
 Western Province failed to secure a vital bonus point in their 23–7 victory over the Boland Cavaliers in Wellington, leaving their semifinal hopes in dire straits.
 The Western Province vs Boland Cavaliers match was moved to Newlands on Friday 26 September due to the heavy rain during the week in the Western Cape that caused flooding at the Boland Stadium, but the Free State Cheetahs complained that they had to play the Boland Cavaliers on 2 August in Wellington. Due to this referee Christie du Preez had to make a decision if it was fit to play at the Boland Stadium, Inspection to field took place on Saturday morning and it was rendered that the Boland Stadium was fine for the crucial match.
  have officially secured a home semifinal thanks to an emphatic 34–20 bonus point victory over the Lions, in their clash in Johannesburg.

Round 14

Round 14 summary
 The Blue Bulls were very nearly left red-faced in front of the Loftus Versfeld faithful as they scraped a 22–20 win over the Falcons
 The Free State Cheetahs did enough to secure their passage to the semifinals courtesy of a 50–40 victory over the Boland Cavaliers in Bloemfontein.
  confirmed their status and favourites for this year's when they continued their good form with a 66–12 win over the Griquas in Durban.
 Western Province 14-6 Lions

Knockout stage

Semi finals

Final
The  ended a 12-year wait for a trophy by winning the final, against the Blue Bulls in Durban on Saturday 25 October, by 14–9. And they did it in style outscoring the Blue Bulls by two tries to nil.

Promotion/relegation matches

Round 1

Round 2

Promotion/relegation table

Results
 Boland Cavaliers manage to stay in the Premier Division.
 Platinum Leopards are promoted to the Premier Division.
 The Griffons just lost out to the Boland Cavaliers to remain in the First Division.
 The Falcons are relegated to the First Division after losing both their matches against the Platinum Leopards.

Statistics

Top point scorers

Top try scorers

Disciplinary records by team

Worst disciplinary records by player

References

External links
 Latest Currie Cup News
 

 
2008
2008 in South African rugby union
2008 rugby union tournaments for clubs